The History Division, Ministry of Defence is an inter-service organization that conducts the research, compilation and preservation of the history of the Indian Armed Forces. Formerly known as the Historical Section, it was established on 26 October 1953.

Publications 
It has brought out 18 volumes including:

 History of Operations in Jammu & Kashmir 1947-48
 Operation Polo – The Police Action Against Hyderabad, 1948
 Operation Vijay – The Liberation of Goa and other Portuguese Colonies in India, 1961
 The India-Pakistan War of 1965: A History
 The India-Pakistan war of 1971: A History
 Saga of Valour (Param Vir Chakra and Ashoka Chakra Winners)
 Stories of Heroism (Param Vir Chakra and Mahavir Chakra Winners)
 Stories of Heroism (Ashoka Chakra and Kirti Chakra Winners)
 History of Indian Armed Forces in UN Operations in Congo, 1960-63
 Custodian Force India or The Indian Troops in Korea 1953-54
 Operation Shanti (Indian Troops in Egypt)
 History of the Custodian Force (India) in Korea, 1953-54
 Terrific Responsibility: The Battle for Peace in Indo-China, 1954-75

References 

Ministry of Defence (India)